The Chennai Egmore–Nagercoil Express is a Superfast train belonging to Southern Railway that runs between  and  in India. It is currently being operated with 12667/12668 train numbers on a weekly basis.

Service

The 12667/Chennai Egmore→Nagercoil Weekly Superfast Express has an average speed of 67 km/hr and covers 724 km in 12h 15m. The 12668/Nagercoil–Chennai Egmore Weekly Superfast Express has an average speed of 67 km/hr and covers 724 km in 12h 20m.

Coach composition

The train consists of 24 coaches (ICF) as follows:

See also 

 Pearl City Express
 Pandian Express
 Pallavan Express
 Ananthapuri Express
 Vaigai Express
 Chendur Express

Notes

References

External links 

 12667/Chennai Egmore–Nagercoil Weekly Superfast Express India Rail Info
 12668/Nagercoil–Chennai Egmore Weekly Superfast Express India Rail Info

Transport in Chennai
Transport in Nagercoil
Express trains in India
Rail transport in Tamil Nadu
Railway services introduced in 2006